Mynydd Drumau (meaning "Mountain of the Ridges" in English) is a mountain in south Wales lying on the border between Swansea and the county of Neath Port Talbot.  

It is 272m / 892ft high, and is a Marilyn. The mountain is situated in a suburban and rural upland zone and is dotted with a number of farms and woodlands. 

Villages and suburbs lining the foot of the mountain include: Skewen, Birchgrove, Bryncoch, Rhos and Glais.

References

External links

Mountaindays.net: Mynydd Drummau
www.geograph.co.uk : photos of Mynydd Drumau and surrounding area

Mountains and hills of Neath Port Talbot
Mountains and hills of Swansea
Marilyns of Wales